The Niederdorf district refers to an area in Zürich's old town across and along the river from the train station. It is known as being a main destination for the city's nightlife, as well as many shops and beautiful alleyways. It gets its name from Niederdorfstrasse, which is the bustling main strip where you'll find the many trendy clothes stores and fast food joints.

References

Geography of Zürich